Canon Cat is a task-dedicated desktop computer released by Canon Inc. in 1987 at the price of U.S. $1,495. On the surface, it was not unlike dedicated word processors popular in the late 1970s to early 1980s, but it was far more powerful, and incorporated many unique ideas for data manipulation.

Description 
Canon Cat is primarily the creation of Jef Raskin, the originator of the Macintosh project at Apple. After leaving the company in 1982 and founding Information Appliance, Inc., he began designing a new computer closer to his original vision of an inexpensive, utilitarian "people's computer". Information Appliance developed the Swyft computer prototype, and then developed and licensed it to Canon as the Cat. BYTE in 1987 described the Cat as "a spiritual heir to the Macintosh". 

It features a text user interface, not making use of any pointer (mouse), icons, or graphics. All data are seen as a long "stream" of text broken into several pages. Instead of using a traditional command line interface or menu system, the Cat makes use of its special keyboard, with commands being activated by holding down a "Use Front" key and pressing another key. The Cat also uses special "Leap keys", which, when held down, allows the user to incrementally search for strings of characters.

The machine's hardware consists of a 9-inch (229 mm) black-and-white monitor (80 x 24 character display, 672 x 344 resolution), a single 3½-inch 256 KB floppy disk drive, and an IBM Selectric–compatible keyboard. It uses a Motorola 68000 CPU (like the Macintosh, Lisa, Atari ST, and Amiga) running at 5 MHz, has 256 KB of RAM, and an internal 300/1200 bit/s modem. Setup and user preference data are stored in 8 KB of non-volatile (battery backed-up) RAM. The Cat's array of I/O interfaces encompasses one Centronics parallel port, one RS-232C serial port (DB-25), and two RJ11 telephone jacks for the modem loop. The total weight of the system is 17 pounds (7.7 kg).

An extensive range of application software is built into 256 KB of ROM: standard office suite programs, communications, a 90,000-word spelling dictionary, and user programming toolchains for Forth and assembly language.

A text-only machine, the Cat includes graphics routines in ROM as well as connectors for a mouse or other pointing device that are never used.

There is a defunct software project called Archy, initiated by Raskin, to develop a similar yet even more capable system for current computing systems. The project was designed to eventually replace current software user interfaces.

See also
 Jupiter Ace, a British home computer of the early 1980s that also used Forth

References

External links
 
 
 CanonCat.org
 Canon Cat Computer User Manual
 Canon Cat Computer Reference Manual
 Canon Cat Computer Repair Manual
 Promotional Video for Leap and Canon Cat (If broken link: video is titled "Leap Technology")
 SwyftCard Quick Reference Card (for the earlier SwyftCard, giving the Apple II somewhat similar functionality)
 SwyftCard guide, glossary, and reference manual
 BYTE SwyftCard review

Canon Inc.
Jef Raskin
Personal computers
Products introduced in 1987
68k-based computers